Sophie Wais Braun (born 26 January 2000), known as Sophia Braun, is an American-born Argentine footballer who plays as a midfielder for Liga MX Femenil side Club León and the Argentina women's national team.

Early life
Braun was raised in Beaverton, Oregon to an American father and an Argentine mother.

High school and college career
Braun has attended the Jesuit High School in Beaverton, Oregon and the Gonzaga University in Spokane, Washington.

International career
Braun represented Argentina at the 2020 South American Under-20 Women's Football Championship. She made her senior debut on 18 February 2021, in a 1–4 loss to Brazil at that year's edition of the SheBelieves Cup.

References

2000 births
Living people
Citizens of Argentina through descent
Argentine women's footballers
Women's association football midfielders
Argentina women's youth international footballers
Argentina women's international footballers
Jewish Argentine sportspeople
Jewish footballers
Jewish sportswomen
Argentine people of American descent
Sportspeople from Beaverton, Oregon
Soccer players from Oregon
American women's soccer players
Gonzaga Bulldogs women's soccer players
Jewish American sportspeople
American people of Argentine-Jewish descent
Sportspeople of Argentine descent
21st-century American Jews
21st-century American women